El Monte Mobile Village is a census-designated place (CDP) comprising three census blocks in Tulare County, California, United States. The village was first listed as a CDP prior to the 2020 census.

References 

Census-designated places in Tulare County, California
Census-designated places in California